Penmaenpool (Welsh: Llynpenmaen) is a hamlet on the south side of the estuary of the River Mawddach in Wales, near Dolgellau. A Grade II listed toll bridge provides access across the estuary for light vehicles.

Points of interest 

Penmaenpool toll bridge is a wooden toll bridge built in 1879 to replace a ferry crossing. It links the A493 running along the south bank of the Mawddach to the A496 running along the north. It is Cadw-registered and was Grade II listed in 1990. The bridge can only be used by vehicles under 2.5 tonnes, and around 200 crossings are made each day.

The George III Inn was originally two buildings: a ship chandler serving the boatbuilding industry, and a pub.  It dates from approximately 1650. Gerard Manley Hopkins reputedly wrote the poem entitled "Penmaen Pool" in the visitor's book.

Penmaenpool railway station was on the Aberystwith and Welsh Coast Railway. It opened as Penmaen Pool on 3 July 1865, and closed to goods on 4 May 1964 and passengers on 18 January 1965. The route is now part of the Mawddach Trail and is popular with walkers.

Incidents
Fifteen people, including four children, drowned on 22 July 1966 when the ferry Prince of Wales hit the toll bridge. The ferry had been taking 39 people on a pleasure trip from Barmouth to the hotel in the village. Though 27 lives were saved, nobody was officially recognised for bravery. A memorial was held by the signal box on the 50th anniversary of the disaster in 2016, and a plaque was unveiled commemorating the victims.

References

Citations

Sources

Villages in Gwynedd
Villages in Snowdonia
Dolgellau